Midotiopsis is a genus of fungi in the order Helotiales. It has two species.

References

Leotiomycetes
Leotiomycetes genera
Taxa described in 1902
Taxa named by Paul Christoph Hennings